We Love You is the seventh studio album by the American electro-industrial band Combichrist. The album was released on 24 March 2014, and includes the singles "From My Cold Dead Hands" and "Maggots at the Party".

A video for "Maggots at the Party" was released to YouTube on April 1, 2014.

Reception

The Revolver magazine's reviewer wrote that Combichrist's music should rather be labelled "Electronic Death Metal than Electronic Dance Music" and observed a "nihilistic" attitude. According to the Sonic Seducer, the album is a return to Combichrist's original electronic style. The song "Denial" was interpreted as a homage to Nine Inch Nails while "The Evil In Me" was seen as a reference to Johnny Cash.

We Love You peaked at #39 in the German Media Control Charts.

Track listing
All songs written by Andy LaPlegua.

References

External links
 Combichrist website

2014 albums
Combichrist albums
Metropolis Records albums